Moses Elijah McGarry (February 19, 1878 – June 11, 1949) was a physician and political figure in Nova Scotia, Canada. He represented Inverness in the Nova Scotia House of Assembly from 1928 to 1940 and Inverness—Richmond in the House of Commons of Canada from 1940 to 1949 as a Liberal member.

He was born in Harvard Lakes, Nova Scotia, the son of James McGarry and Ann Tompkins. He was educated at the Guysboro Academy and Dalhousie University. In 1903, he married Florence Irwin. McGarry was named Speaker of the House of Assembly of Nova Scotia in 1939; he resigned his seat the following year to run for a seat in the House of Commons. He died in office at the age of 71.

References 
 
 Canadian Parliamentary Guide, 1941, AL Normandin

1878 births
1949 deaths
Nova Scotia Liberal Party MLAs
Speakers of the Nova Scotia House of Assembly
Liberal Party of Canada MPs
Members of the House of Commons of Canada from Nova Scotia